U 11 is the Rundata designation for a runestone that is located near the ruins of the old king's dwelling at Alsnö hus near Hovgården on the island of Adelsö in Sweden.

Description
This runestone has an intricate design with the runic text within serpents. The inscription is unsigned and is classified as being carved in runestone style Pr4, which is also known as Urnes style. This runestone style is characterized by slim and stylized animals that are interwoven into tight patterns. The animal heads are typically seen in profile with slender almond-shaped eyes and upwardly curled appendages on the noses and the necks.

Tolir is described as being a "bryte," which is an old Swedish word for a thrall who worked as the thralls' foreman. The word "bryte" comes from "to break," in the meaning of breaking bread, so "bryte" can be interpreted as the person who serves out food.

Gylla was Tolir's wife. Håkon is believed to be the reigning king Håkan the Red, who is generally accepted as ruling during the 1070s. This would be consistent with the runic text, which using the word kunungi or kunungr, Old Norse for "king." Because of this, the stone is known as Håkansstenen.

Tranlisteration of runic text into Latin letters
raþ| |þu : runaʀ : ret : lit : rista : toliʀ : bry[t]i : i roþ : kunuki : toliʀ : a(u)k : gyla : litu : ris... ...- : þaun : hion : eftiʀ ...k : merki srni... haku(n) * (b)aþ : rista

See also 
 Alsnö hus

References

External links
U 11, Hovgården, Adelsö

Additional images

Uppland Runic Inscription 0011